Clee St. Margaret is a small village and civil parish in the Clee Hills area of Shropshire, England. It is seven miles north east (about a fifteen-minute drive) from the market town of Ludlow. 

The Clee Brook passes through the settlement, as a 50-metre long, shallow ford. Local land use includes two small vineyards and extensive sheep grazing.

There is a 900-year-old parish church and a village hall, but no pub. Clee St. Margaret had five pubs earlier during the height of the quarrying on nearby Brown Clee Hill. Historically the settlement also had a shop, a Methodist Chapel, a school and a post office.

Population and housing
The parish includes the hamlet of Cockshutford.

The population in 2001 of Clee St. Margaret was 126, 65 being males and 61 being females. Over the years the population of this small village has declined: in 1871 it was over double today's average, at 297.

The number of houses has also fluctuated. From 1841 to 1881 it rose from 71 to 76, before declining to 48 in 1921; since then it has increased slightly, reaching 51 in 1961 and today there are 65 houses.

In recent years there has been a slight rise in the number of households. This may be due to the housing density declining in recent years. In 1931, 1609 people were living with more than one person whereas in 2001 only 510 residents in South Shropshire were living with more than one person. The average house price of Clee St Margaret was about £281,462 in April 2012. Prices are relatively low compared to the rest of England because of the location and because most houses are small.

Education
Clee St. Margaret's population is made up mostly of families and couples. The education level for the area of South Shropshire has improved greatly. In 1851 school attendance was lower than those not attending, however in 2001, 716 children were attending and only 191 stayed at home. There are two primary schools within 6 km radiance and five playgroups centres within 7 km radiance. 

The proportion of residents with a degree living in the South Shropshire district is relatively low. In 2011, residents without a degree were 23,029 and those with a degree 5,393.

Employment
In 1881 the land was generally used for agriculture. Most of the male residents worked in agriculture, and the females were employed in domestic services or offices. Today, the service sector provides the most employment, employing 10,364 residents of South Shropshire, while 1,855 are employed in agriculture. Most of the population travel to work, on average 38.80 km, implying they are employed in services in Kidderminster or Shrewsbury.

Governance
The village falls within the electoral ward simply called Clee. This ward includes several of the villages in the Clee Hills, with a total population taken at the 2011 census of 4,595.

Religion and politics

The main religion in Clee St Margaret and the surrounding area of South Shropshire is Christianity, with Islam and Buddhism following. The church was renewed in 1860 and is used regularly for Christian worship

Clee St Margaret is in the Conservative-held  constituency of Ludlow. The Member of Parliament for the constituency is Philip Dunne who was Minister for Defence Procurement from 2012 to 2016, then Minister of State for Health until 2018.

Climate
Clee St Margaret is within The Midlands of England, causing it to experience a mixture of both southern and northern climatic conditions. When rainfall is concerned it is a transitional area between Wales and the East of England. As the Midlands region is at some distance from the sea, the annual range of temperature is more pronounced than in most parts of the UK. It is subjected to sharp winter frosts and occasional very hot summer days, particularly in the south and east of the region where Clee St Margaret is located. These temperature extremes of both winter and summer are a key characteristic of the Midlands climate.

The coldest months are January and February, reaching highs of 7 °C and lows of 0 °C. The warmest months are July and August, with highs of 21 °C and lows of 10 °C.

See also
Listed buildings in Clee St. Margaret

References

External links

Civil parishes in Shropshire
Villages in Shropshire